Raga Bageshri or Bageshree is a Hindustani classical raga. It is a popular night raga, which is meant to depict the emotion of a woman waiting for reunion with her lover. It is said to have been first sung by Miyan Tansen, the celebrated court singer of the Emperor Akbar in the sixteenth century.

In the twentieth century, Bageshri raga found widespread popularity in Carnatic Music. The popular Hindi music director C.Ramchandra favoured composing songs in Bageshri, as he found it simple. In a 1978 interview at BBC studios with Mahendra Kaul, he explained this, while playing songs like (Radha na bole - Azad, 1955) that were set to Bageshri.

Theory
The theoretical aspects of Bageshri are as follows:

Scale
Arohana :  S g m D n S'
Avarohana : S' n D m P D g m g R S

Vadi & Samavadi
Vadi :  Madhyam (Ma)
Samavadi:  Shadja (Sa)

Pakad or Chalan
D n s, m, m P D, m g R S

Varjit Swara - P & R in Aaroh

Jati : - Audav-Sampoorna (Vakra)

Organization & Relationships
Thaat: Kafi (raga)

Samay (Time)

Carnatic music

In the twentieth century, Bageshri raga found widespread popularity in Carnatic Music, in which it is said to be derived from the equivalent Melakarta of Kafi thaat, the 22nd Melakarta called Kharaharapriya. This raga is a janya raga (derived) as it does not have all the seven notes in the ascending scale.

Structure and Lakshana
Bageshri is an asymmetric scale that does not contain panchamam or rishabam in the ascending scale. It is called a audava-sampurna rāgam, in Carnatic music classification (as it has 5 notes in ascending and 7 notes in descending scale). Its  structure is as follows (see 
swaras in Carnatic music for details on below notation and terms):

 : 
 : 

Popular compositions
Bageshri has become a popular raga in Carnatic music. This scale has been used in a few krithis (compositions). In addition, many devaranamas, ashtapadis, thiruppugazhs, and other lyrics have been set to tune in this raga. It is typically sung in concerts after the main piece, in viruttams, padams, bhajans and ragamalika.

Here are some popular compositions in Bageshri.

Eru mayil eri vilayaducomposed by Arunagirinathar
Sagarasayana by M. D. Ramanathan
Maname Ariyen by Papanasam Sivan
Antakanadutarige KiMchittu dayavilla  by Purandaradasa
Govindamiha by Narayana Theertha

Film Songs

Language:Tamil

Language:Hindi

See also

List of Film Songs based on Ragas

Notes

References

Sources

External links
SRA on Samay and Ragas
SRA on Ragas and Thaats
Rajan Parrikar on Ragas
Rajan Parrikar on Bageshree
Film Songs in Rag Bageshree
More details about raga Bageshree

Hindustani ragas
Janya ragas